Evan J. Peterson (sometimes called Evan Peterson) is an American author, poet, and educator.

Peterson teaches writing and emphasizes that poetry should be performed. His performances have been characterized as "high-art concept-driven" and outrageous. A reviewer for The New York Times named Peterson as being among trendy writers creating apocalypse fiction featuring zombies. Peterson’s poetry often features movie monsters and characters inspired by the final girl trope. Peterson's multidenominational religious background including Jewish, Christian, and Native American faith has influenced his poetry. Peterson was once editor-in-chief of Minor Arcana Press.

Peterson has been sought for comments on HIV issues and PrEP (pre-exposure prophylaxis), LGBT themes in comics, and The Rocky Horror Picture Show.

The PrEP Diaries
In 2017 Peterson released the nonfiction book The PrEP Diaries: A Safe(r) Sex Memoir, published by Lethe Press. The book discusses the drug Truvada, the cultural impact of HIV, and controversial conversations about HIV prevention and safe sex. One reviewer described the book as “an accessible introduction to a complex but unquestionably important moment in our cultural relationship with HIV/AIDS.” In addition to discussing the specifics of pre-exposure prophylaxis with Truvada, the book also discusses “self-care, sex-positivity, and taking control of your own health.”

Selected works

References

External links

Be PrEPared, a radio interview on 1A from NPR

Year of birth missing (living people)
Living people
21st-century American poets
American horror writers
21st-century American memoirists
American social sciences writers
American spoken word artists
American gay writers
HIV/AIDS activists
21st-century American male writers
American male non-fiction writers